Antonio Carlos Silva (born August 24, 1952) is a Brazilian former football manager.

Coaching career
In 1995, he signed with Yokohama Flügels and served as a coach under manager Bunji Kimura. In May, Kimura resigned and Silva became a new manager. He left the club end of 1995 season.

Managerial statistics

References

External links

1952 births
Living people
Brazilian footballers
J1 League managers
Yokohama Flügels managers
Association footballers not categorized by position
Brazilian football managers